Charles Edward Stuart (November 25, 1810May 19, 1887) was a U.S. Representative and U.S. Senator from the state of Michigan.

Biography

Stuart was born in New York, either near Waterloo, New York, or in Columbia County. He studied law, was admitted to the bar in 1832, and commenced practice in Waterloo. He moved to Michigan in 1835 and settled in Portage, Michigan.

Stuart was a member of the state house of representatives in 1842 and was elected as a Democrat from Michigan's 2nd congressional district to the 30th Congress to fill the vacancy caused by the death of Edward Bradley. He served in the U.S.House from December 6, 1847, to March 4, 1849, and was defeated for reelection in 1848 by William Sprague. Two years later, he defeated Sprague by being elected to the 32nd Congress, serving from March 4, 1851, to March 3, 1853. He served as chairman of the Committee on Expenditures in the Department of State in the 32nd Congress.

Stuart was elected to the U.S. Senate in 1852 and served in the 34th, 35th, and 36th Congresses from March 4, 1853, to March 3, 1859. He was the President pro tempore of the Senate during the 34th Congress, and chairman of the Committee on Public Lands in the 34th and 35th Congresses. He did not seek reelection to the Senate but was an unsuccessful candidate for Governor of Michigan in 1858. He resumed the practice of law in Kalamazoo and was a delegate to the 1860 Democratic National Convention from Michigan.

During the Civil War, Stuart raised and equipped the 13th Michigan Infantry, of which he was commissioned colonel. He later resigned due to ill health.

Charles E. Stuart died in Kalamazoo and was interred in Mountain Home Cemetery. His home in Kalamazoo at 427 Stuart Ave. is listed on the National Register of Historic Places. The surrounding Stuart Area Historic District is also listed.

See also

References

 Retrieved on 2008-02-15
Charles E. Stuart at The Political Graveyard

External links
 

1810 births
1887 deaths
Democratic Party members of the Michigan House of Representatives
Michigan lawyers
New York (state) lawyers
Union Army colonels
Politicians from Kalamazoo, Michigan
People from Waterloo, New York
People of Michigan in the American Civil War
Democratic Party United States senators from Michigan
Democratic Party members of the United States House of Representatives from Michigan
19th-century American politicians
19th-century American lawyers